The Hilton San Francisco Union Square is a skyscraper hotel located several blocks south-west of Union Square in San Francisco, California. Opened in 1964, the innovative 18-story, 1200-room original building was known as a "motel within a hotel", allowing guests to park directly next to their upper-story rooms. Filling an entire city block, it remains one of the tallest structures representing Brutalist architecture, though it has been extensively altered since its construction. A second 46-story tower was added in 1971, while a third smaller 23-story connecting tower was completed in 1987. 
Renovated in 2017 and still operated by Hilton, it is currently the largest hotel on the West Coast, with 1,921 rooms.

History

Opening and unique design
The hotel opened on May 25, 1964, as the San Francisco Hilton. Built at a cost of $29 million and designed by noted architect William B. Tabler, the innovative 18-story, 1200-room structure was known as a motel within a hotel due to a design featuring a series of ramps in the middle of the building, allowing guests to drive their cars directly to seven of the hotel's lower floors and park adjacent to their room. Tabler's design also employed a checkerboard facade of windows and decorative panels to disguise the building's earthquake bracing. It was the 60th Hilton hotel in the company's worldwide operations.

In the original building, there was no 13th floor, while the 12th to the 15th floors housed mechanical equipment. Floors 16 to 19 contained guest rooms, overlooking an inner courtyard and garden on the 16th floor, with a landscaped plaza and a swimming pool and cabana-style rooms. There was also a heated garden court and sunbathing areas. There were a number of restaurants and bars on the lobby floor, including a Cafe Bellagio. It also had one of the world's largest ballrooms at the time, which was reached by escalators from the lobby to the floor below, handling a banquet of 2000 or a meeting for 3000. Sliding partitions allowed the space to be divided into nine soundproof rooms, each with lighting and television and projection booths. Thirteen private dining rooms were on the floor above the ballroom, with the entire facility focused on conventions. On the 19th floor were two suites, each with a living room and two bedrooms, with a spiral stairway leading to a penthouse solarium for parties of 100 or more. If the suites were not spoken for, Hilton said it would rent them for $200 a day. Room rates were $12 to $23 a day for singles, and $18 to $27 for doubles. The hotel was built by Cahill Brothers, Inc. in San Francisco, with David T. Williams, Inc. of New York handled the decorating.
 
The Beatles stayed at the San Francisco Hilton during their 1964 US tour, opening their tour at San Francisco on August 18 after staying the night before at the Hilton Hotel.

The San Francisco Hilton's distinctive parking layout is memorably featured in the 1968 film Petulia, filmed in part at the hotel.

Second tower
The 46-story,  Hilton Tower addition was completed in 1971, joined to the original wing by a skybridge.  Due to the hotel addition's height, 
this makes it the tallest building in San Francisco to be located outside both the Financial District and the South of Market District.

The hotel was featured in the 1972 screwball comedy What's Up Doc?, where the main characters stay at a Hotel Bristol hosting a music convention. Filming took place in the new 46-story skyscraper hotel, with the lobby, drugstore, ballroom, seventeenth floor, and partly-finished top floor all filling the first hour of the film.

In March 1985, Hilton was refused permission to open a casino property in Atlantic City, with the New Jersey Casino Control Commission in part citing that "reputed members of organized crime had frequented the San Francisco Hilton and had been seen coming and going at the office of Henri Lewin, a Hilton executive vice president....Werner Lewin, a Hilton vice president and general manager of the San Francisco Hilton, asked Hilton employees to destroy records because of a pending Federal antitrust investigation," which had found "associations with individuals of the most alarming type."

Third tower and renovations
From 1985–1988, the hotel was completely rebuilt at a cost of $150 million, to designs by architect John Carl Warnecke, with the addition of a 26-story  third tower, connecting the two original towers, and rehabilitation of the first five levels of the Hilton Plaza. Tabler's original checkerboard facade was removed and replaced with a more contemporary post-modern facade to match the new wing.

Between 2011 and 2017, the hotel underwent a $130 million overhaul, including noise-canceling windows and doors in guest rooms. The renovation was finished in 2017, with updates in Tower Two. It is the largest hotel on the West Coast.

See also

 San Francisco's tallest buildings

References

External links
 Hilton San Francisco Union Square hotel website

San Francisco Union Square
Hotel buildings completed in 1964
Skyscraper hotels in San Francisco
Tenderloin, San Francisco
1964 establishments in California